Togo competed at the 2017 World Aquatics Championships in Budapest, Hungary from 14 to 30 July.

Swimming

Togo received a Universality invitation from FINA to send two swimmers (one man and one woman) to the World Championships.

References

Nations at the 2017 World Aquatics Championships
2017
World Aquatics Championships